Narana Sinai Coissoró, GOIP GOC GCIH (born 3 October 1933), is a Portuguese lawyer, professor and retired politician of the right-wing CDS – People's Party.

Political activity

Narana Coissoró is a former Deputy to the Assembly of the Republic. He was leader of his party parliamentary group between 1978 and 1991.

Other activities
Coissoró is President of the Center for Oriental Studies of the Instituto Superior de Ciências Sociais e Políticas (ISCSP - Higher Institute of Political and Social Sciences), of the  Technical University of Lisbon. He also heads the Goan Community Centre in Portugal.

Personal life

Narana Coissoró is married to Teresa da Costa Brandão, born at Caldas da Rainha, by whom he has a daughter, Smitá da Costa Brandão Coissoró.

He has a degree in law by the University of Coimbra and a doctorate from SOAS, University of London.

Awards

 Grand Officer of the Order of Public Instruction (09-06-1993)
 Grand Officer of the Order of Christ (09-06-1995)
 Grand Cross of the Order of Prince Henry (30-01-2006)

Publications

References

1933 births
Living people
Portuguese Hindus
Portuguese people of Goan descent
Portuguese politicians of Indian descent
Goa politicians
CDS – People's Party politicians
Members of the Assembly of the Republic (Portugal)
20th-century Portuguese lawyers
University of Coimbra alumni